Jeannette Grace Ngock Yango (born 12 June 1993) is a Cameroonian footballer who plays as a midfielder for Division 1 Féminine club FC Fleury and the Cameroon national team.

Honours
1. FFC Turbine Potsdam
 Bundesliga: Runner-up 2012–13
 DFB-Pokal: Runner-up 2012–13

References

External links 
 

1993 births
Living people
Cameroonian women's footballers
Women's association football forwards
ŽFK Spartak Subotica players
En Avant Guingamp (women) players
1. FFC Turbine Potsdam players
Division 1 Féminine players
Frauen-Bundesliga players
Cameroon women's international footballers
2015 FIFA Women's World Cup players
2019 FIFA Women's World Cup players
Cameroonian expatriate women's footballers
Cameroonian expatriate sportspeople in Serbia
Expatriate women's footballers in Serbia
Cameroonian expatriate sportspeople in France
Expatriate women's footballers in France
Cameroonian expatriate sportspeople in Germany
Expatriate women's footballers in Germany
21st-century Cameroonian women
20th-century Cameroonian women